Otto Beyeler (21 July 1926 – 20 September 2004) was a Swiss cross-country skier who competed in the 1950s. He finished 15th in the 50 km event at the 1952 Winter Olympics in Oslo.

External links
Olympic 50 km cross country skiing results: 1948-64
Otto Beyeler's profile at Sports Reference.com
 

1926 births
2004 deaths
Olympic cross-country skiers of Switzerland
Cross-country skiers at the 1952 Winter Olympics
Swiss male cross-country skiers